A portable roller coaster is a roller coaster that is designed to be operated at multiple locations.

Notable portable roller coasters include:
 Big Fury
 Eurostar
 Olympia Looping